Gushtin (also Romanized as Gūshtīn; also known as Gushtun and Kushtān) is a village in Sohrevard Rural District, in the Central District of Khodabandeh County, Zanjan Province, Iran. At the 2006 census, its population was 19, in 5 families.

References 

Populated places in Khodabandeh County